Chahardeh Sankhvast Rural District is a rural district (dehestan) in Jolgeh Sankhvast District, Jajrom County, North Khorasan Province, Iran. At the 2006 census, its population was 2,257, in 645 families.  The rural district has 6 villages.

References 

Rural Districts of North Khorasan Province
Jajrom County